XHNF-FM is a radio station on 97.7 FM in Tepic, Nayarit. The station is owned by Radiorama and is known as La Nayarita.

History
XHNF began with a concession awarded to José de Jesús Cortés Barbosa on March 25, 1976, making it one of Nayarit's first FM stations. The station was sold to Radio Impulsora del Nayar, S.A., in 1988 and later to its current concessionaire.

Until 2016, XHNF was known as "Ráfaga", a unique name used on only a handful of Radiorama stations in Sinaloa and Nayarit. It then became La Nayarita.

References

Radio stations in Nayarit